Signos is an Argentinian 2015 TV series, co-produced by Pol-ka Producciones and Turner Broadcasting System, aired by eltrece and by the American network TNT. The show first aired on 2 September 2015. The main actors are Julio Chávez, Claudia Fontán and Alberto Ajaka. Originally, Signos aired at 11pm, but starting from the third episode, it airs at 10:30pm. The series concluded on 16 December 2015, with an 11.1 audience rating average.

Premise 
Antonio Cruz (Chávez) is an ordinary doctor who lives with his sister, Laura (Fontán), and her family in San Rafael de los Penitentes, a quiet town where nothing of interest ever happens. He is a clever and worshipful person, who is unhappy because of something which occurred in his childhood to his mother. He wants to revenge this situation, killing one or more people in each episode according to their astrological sign.

Cast

Main 
 Julio Chávez as Antonio Cruz 
 Claudia Fontán as Laura Cruz
 Alberto Ajaka as Pablo Agüero

Recurring 
 Leonor Manso as Beatríz Félix 
 Pilar Gamboa as Florencia Barón 
 Héctor Bidonde as Óscar Siri
 Cristina Alberó as María del Carmen
 Roxana Berco as Mónica 
 Miriam Odorico as Cecilia
 Luciano Cáceres as Ricardo 
 Roberto Carnaghi as Miguel Abdala
 Luis Luque as Darío Castelani
 María Merlino as Silvina
 Adriana Aizemberg as Nelly
 Naiara Awada as Manuela
 Guadalupe Manent as Sofía Agüero
 Tomás Wicz as Martín Agüero
 Noemí Frenkel as Graciela Fuentes 
 Luz Palazon as María José
 Marcos Montes as Carpaneto
 Carlos Rivkin as Rubén
 María lujan lamas como candelaria

Guest start 
 Franco Pucci as Young Antonio Cruz
 Alexia Moyano as Antonio's mother
 Adriana Balbo as Young María del Carmen

Awards 

 2015 Martín Fierro Awards
 Best lead actress (Claudia Fontán)

Reception and audience 
Signos first aired before Binbir Gece, and had a 17.1 average rating, being the third most-viewed TV programme of the day (for Sifema, made 11.8 and was the seventh most-viewed). The following table shows Signos audience average in each episode, in Argentina, at El Trece, according to both firms that measures media audiences, Ibope and PASCAL Sifema.

Ratings 

Notes

Episodes 

Signos has 16 episodes, and the main character, Antonio, kills someone each episode, according to his astrological sign. Originally, it aired on 2 September at El Trece, exclusively for Argentina, and one day later, it aired at TNT (at 10 pm.), for Latin America. It is also available at TNT GO, on "catch up" system, when the original airing ends.

It was filmed at different places from Buenos Aires Province and Autonomous City of Buenos Aires.

References

External links
 

2015 telenovelas
Argentine police procedural television series
Pol-ka telenovelas
2015 Argentine television series debuts
Argentine LGBT-related television shows